Choi Sang-Kook (born February 15, 1961) is a South Korea football manager and former footballer who plays as a forward. He played only for POSCO Atoms.

Club career
Choi Sang-Kook was the top scorer in the 1987 K-League season and he was also the top assister. He broke Piyapong Piew-on's record in the 1985 K-League season. He is the last man that was the top scorer and assister in the same season .

International career
He was part of the South Korea national football team. He played at 1984 AFC Asian Cup, 1986 Asian Games, 1988 Summer Olympics and many of South Korea's matches. He played at the 1990 FIFA World Cup qualification, but he failed to join the final squad.

Career statistics

Club

International goals 
Results list South Korea's goal tally first.

External links
 
 
 

1961 births
Living people
Association football forwards
South Korean footballers
South Korea international footballers
Pohang Steelers players
K League 1 players
1984 AFC Asian Cup players
Footballers at the 1988 Summer Olympics
Olympic footballers of South Korea
People from Chungju
Sportspeople from North Chungcheong Province